Foxhall Alexander Parker Sr. (1788 – 23 November 1857) was an officer in the United States Navy. He was Commander-in-Chief of the East India Squadron (ie.

Biography 
Parker was born in Rock Spring, Westmoreland County, Virginia. 

In 1814, he married Sarah Jay Bogardus (born 1794), daughter of Robert Bogardus (1771–1841). They had eight children, including Foxhall A. Parker Jr. (1821–1879) and William Harwar Parker (1826–1896), who were also prominent naval officers.

Career
Parker joined the Navy as a midshipman on January 1, 1808. During the War of 1812 he was captured at sea.  He was commissioned lieutenant on March 9, 1813, commander on March 3, 1825, and captain on March 3, 1835.

Parker was appointed commander of the East Indian Squadron in 1843. While in this position he was involved with Caleb Cushing's mission to Macao where Parker and Cushing were the two of the three signatories of the historic first Sino-American pact, known as the Treaty of Wanghia.

Following his assignment with Cushing, while commanding the Boston naval yard (an assignment he held for three and a half years), he was sent to Europe in 1848 to advise the German government. They had requested an American officer to assist with the organization of their navy. He was sent on the recommendation of the Secretary of the Navy, John T. Mason. While there he was entertained by the King of Germany and other dignitaries, and then offered Supreme Command of the German Navy (Reichsflotte), established in 1848, it was the first navy for all of Germany. He declined, his son later presumed, because he didn't want to leave the US Navy and was concerned about the unsettled state of Europe at the time.  

In 1851, Parker was appointed "special Commissioner" to Havana, Cuba, to meet with Spanish General Captain Concha, who held 156 American prisoners destined for prison mines over a failed insurrection. Parker's negotiations with Concha were made in parallel with other American diplomats, but Parker's contributions 'did no harm' in Concha's later decision to release the prisoners.

Also in 1851, Parker was involved in an incident in Nicaragua involving a British ship firing on an American ship, which could have escalated into an Anglo-American war. The wealthy business magnate Cornelius Vanderbilt arrived by ship in the Nicaraguan port of Greytown (a British port), refused to pay port fees and steamed away. The British fired upon Vanderbilt and escorted his ship back to harbor where the angered Vanderbilt paid the fee. Parker with two warships was dispatched to Greytown where he informed the British the United States would not tolerate the collection of port duties by the British Navy. The British officer commanding the Royal Navy in the Caribbean (Vice-Admiral George F. Seymour) took immediate steps to defuse the crisis by admonishing the captain who had fired the shots, and sent one of his captains to meet with Parker and assure him "the interception of Vanderbilt's ship was completely unauthorized", and a larger incident was averted.

In 1851, as a commodore, he commanded the Home Squadron. He was relieved from this assignment in 1853.

See also

References 

People from Westmoreland County, Virginia
1788 births
1857 deaths
United States Navy commodores
United States Navy personnel of the War of 1812
People from Virginia in the War of 1812
War of 1812 prisoners of war held by the United Kingdom